Heterotheca, (common names goldenasters, camphorweed, or telegraph weed) are North American plants in the family Asteraceae.

Etymology
Heterotheca comes from Ancient Greek   "other, different" and   "case, chest", and refers to the fact that, in some species in the genus, the cypselae (achenes containing seed) of the disk and ray florets have different shapes.

Description, biology
These are annual and perennial herbs bearing daisy-like flower heads with yellow disc florets and usually yellow ray florets, associated with mesic to xeric habitats across North America. Several species now included in Heterotheca were previously classified in the genus Chrysopsis

Heterotheca species are often used as food plants by the larvae of some Lepidoptera species including Schinia lynx, Schinia nubila and Schinia saturata (all of which have been recorded on Heterotheca subaxillaris).

Chemistry
The leaf volatiles from which the name "camphorweed" is derived include camphor, but as a minor constituent (less than 2%); of the 41 documented volatiles in a study of Heterotheca subaxillaris, for example, caryophyllene, pinene, borneol, myrcene, and limonene each comprised over 5% of the total.

Species
 Heterotheca barbata (Rydb.) Semple - Spokane golden aster - Washington Idaho 
 Heterotheca brandegeei (B.L.Rob. & Greenm.) Semple - northern Baja California 
 Heterotheca camporum (Greene) Shinners - Arkansas Missouri Iowa Illinois Ohio Michigan Kentucky Tennessee Mississippi Alabama Georgia Virginia North Carolina New Jersey
 Heterotheca canescens (DC.) Shinners - Nuevo León, Texas New Mexico Oklahoma Colorado Kansas Missouri Iowa 
 Heterotheca fastigiata (Greene) V.L.Harms - California
 Heterotheca fulcrata (Greene) Shinners - Coahuila, Tamaulipas, Arizona New Mexico Texas Nevada Utah Colorado Wyoming Idaho 
 Heterotheca grandiflora - Telegraphweed - Baja California, California Arizona Nevada Utah 
 Heterotheca gypsophila B.L.Turner - Nuevo León
 Heterotheca inuloides Cass. - Mexican arnica - from Nuevo León to Oaxaca
 Heterotheca jonesii (S.F.Blake) S.L.Welsh & N.D.Atwood - Utah 
 Heterotheca leptoglossa DC. - Guanajuato, Chihuahua, Sonora, Sinaloa, Jalisco, San Luis Potosí
 Heterotheca marginata Semple - Arizona 
 Heterotheca mexicana V.L.Harms ex B.L.Turner - Durango
 Heterotheca monarchensis D.A.York, Shevock & Semple - monarch golden aster - Fresno County in California
 Heterotheca mucronata V.L.Harms ex B.L.Turner - Nuevo León, Coahuila, Tamaulipas
 Heterotheca oregona (Nutt.) Shinners
 Heterotheca pumila (Greene) Semple - Colorado Wyoming Utah New Mexico 
 Heterotheca rutteri (Rothr.) Shinners - Sonora, Arizona 
 Heterotheca sessiliflora (Nutt.) Shinners - Sessileflower false golden aster - Baja California, California 
 Heterotheca shevockii (Semple) Semple - Kern Canyon false golden aster - Kern County in California
 Heterotheca stenophylla (A.Gray) Shinners - Texas New Mexico Oklahoma Colorado Wyoming Kansas Nebraska South Dakota Iowa Minnesota
 Heterotheca subaxillaris (Lam.) Britton & Rusby - Camphorweed, camphor weed, false goldenaster - widespread from Belize to California, South Dakota, + Massachusetts
 Heterotheca villosa (Pursh) Shinners
 Heterotheca viscida (A.Gray) V.L.Harms - Arizona New Mexico Texas 
 Heterotheca zionensis Semple - Zion golden aster - Arizona New Mexico Texas Utah Idaho Wyoming
Sources:

Formerly included
Many species have been included in Heterotheca at various times in the past, but now regarded as more suitable for other genera. The most common of these is Chrysopsis, but others include Aster Bradburia Osbertia Munnozia Pityopsis + Tomentaurum.

References

External links
 
 Jepson Manual Treatment: Heterotheca
 

 
Asteraceae genera
Flora of North America
Taxa named by Henri Cassini